Dries Devenyns (born 22 July 1983) is a Belgian professional road bicycle racer, who currently rides for UCI WorldTeam .

Career
Devenyns left  at the end of the 2013 season, after five seasons with the squad, and joined  for 2014.

Major results

2005
 1st  Road race, National Under-23 Road Championships
2006
 National Amateur Road Championships
1st  Time trial
2nd Road race
 1st  Overall Tour de Bretagne
1st Young rider classification
1st Stages 4 & 5 (ITT)
 4th Flèche Ardennaise
 5th Overall Tour des Pyrénées
1st Prologue
 8th De Vlaamse Pijl
 10th Overall Le Triptyque des Monts et Châteaux
2008
 8th Overall Tour of Turkey
 8th Overall Ster Elektrotoer
 10th Overall Delta Tour Zeeland
2009
 1st Stage 5 Tour of Austria
 5th Overall Tour du Poitou-Charentes
 7th Overall Tour de Wallonie
 9th Giro del Piemonte
2010
 5th Giro del Piemonte
 9th Overall Tour of the Basque Country
2011
 4th Clásica de San Sebastián
 6th Brabantse Pijl
 7th Overall Tour of Oman
 8th Overall Eneco Tour
 10th Trofeo Mallorca
 10th Trofeo Deià
2012
 6th Grote Prijs Jef Scherens
 8th Brabantse Pijl
2013
 5th Overall Tour of Austria
 10th Overall Tour de l'Ain
2014
 8th Omloop Het Nieuwsblad
2015
 6th Overall Tour de l'Eurométropole
 10th Brabantse Pijl
2016
 1st  Overall Tour of Belgium
1st Stage 2
 1st  Overall Tour de Wallonie
1st Stage 5
 1st Grand Prix La Marseillaise
 6th Overall Étoile de Bessèges
 10th Clásica de San Sebastián
2017
 3rd Grand Prix Pino Cerami
 5th Time trial, National Road Championships
 7th Brabantse Pijl
2018
 4th Cadel Evans Great Ocean Road Race
 5th Overall Tour Down Under
 6th Overall Tour of Oman
 9th Overall Tour of Guangxi
2019
 10th Overall Tour Down Under
2020
 1st Cadel Evans Great Ocean Road Race
 7th Gran Piemonte
 10th Brabantse Pijl

Grand Tour general classification results timeline

References

External links 

Profile at Predictor-Lotto official website

Palmares on Cycling Base (French) 

Belgian male cyclists
1983 births
Living people
Sportspeople from Leuven
Cyclists from Flemish Brabant